is a Japanese footballer currently playing as a goalkeeper for Nara Club.

Career
Okada begin first youth career with Matsuyama HS and Biwako Seikei Sport College until he was graduation in 2017.

Okada begin first professional career with FC Imabari in 2018. FC Imabari announces Okada left from the club after expiration contract on 28 November 2022, he play five years at Imabari.

On 26 December at same year, Okada announcement officially transfer to J3 promotion club, Nara Club for upcoming 2023 season.

Career statistics

Club
.

Notes

References

External links

1996 births
Living people
Japanese footballers
Biwako Seikei Sport College alumni
Association football goalkeepers
FC Imabari players
Nara Club players
Japan Football League players
J3 League players